Attack of the Grey Lantern is the debut album by English alternative rock band Mansun released in February 1997 via Parlophone.  The album spent a total of 19 weeks on the UK Albums Chart, peaking at number one.

Background
According to Mansun's Kleptomania liner notes, frontman Paul Draper states that "Take It Easy, Chicken" was their first song and the band really did not know how to play their instruments, let alone play as a band, when DJs Steve Lamacq and John Peel started to play the song on BBC Radio 1.  Through 1996 and 1997, Mansun released "Egg Shaped Fred" (which was re-recorded for the album to include new drummer Andie Rathbone), "Stripper Vicar", "She Makes My Nose Bleed" and "Taxloss" (styled Taxlo$$). "Wide Open Space" became a dance anthem after being remixed by DJ and producer Paul Oakenfold under the production alias Perfecto. This remix was included on Oakenfold's compilation Resident: Two Years of Oakenfold at Cream, as an indicator of being one of the most played songs at major UK nightclub Cream, as well as in nightclubs around the world, over the 1997–1999 period.

"Taxloss" alludes melodically and lyrically to The Beatles' song "Taxman", and also to the rhythmic feel of "Tomorrow Never Knows", as well as "Long Haired Lover from Liverpool" by Little Jimmy Osmond. The video notoriously featured the band throwing £25,000 in five-pound notes onto the main concourse of London's Liverpool Street station during rush hour and watching the ensuing chaos.

Concept album
While Mansun's singer and songwriter, Paul Draper, admits that Attack of the Grey Lantern is not a fully fledged concept album, it was his intention for it to be one, until he "ran out of steam", labelling the LP "half a concept album – a con album". AllMusic referred to the album as a song cycle. The majority of the record is centred on the concept of a superhero, known as "The Grey Lantern", in the guise of Draper himself.  Throughout the album, the hero encounters a number of immoral inhabitants in a fictional English village.

Well, The Grey Lantern is like a comic-book hero – the album is about this village of people with really disgusting morals and the Grey Lantern sorts them out. I suppose the Grey Lantern's me. I wouldn't have a cape, but there are definitely characters on the record – Albert Taxloss, Chad, Dark Mavis. At the end of the album it all gets resolved and you find Mavis is actually the Stripper Vicar.

At the time of release, Draper hinted at a possible album sequel, titled "The Return of the Grey Lantern". For its American release, the album's running order was re-sequenced, a move which some felt compromised the intended concept, as the song "Stripper Vicar" was replaced with "Take It Easy, Chicken."

Release
When Attack of the Grey Lantern was released in February 1997, it charted at No. 1 on the UK Albums Chart. The album was preceded by four singles, the first of which "Egg Shaped Fred" was released a year prior. "Egg Shaped Fred" was Mansun's début single for Parlophone Records and made No. 37 in the UK. The following three singles ("Stripper Vicar", "Wide Open Space", "She Makes My Nose Bleed") all made the top forty each improving of the previous singles' chart position. The final single released from the album was "Taxloss" which followed the album in April 1997 and made No. 15. In the US, Mansun enjoyed their only chart success with "Wide Open Space" reaching the modest position of No. 25 on the Billboard Modern Rock Tracks chart.

Critical reception

Accolades

* denotes an unranked list.

Track listings
UK edition

Japanese edition

US edition

2010 3CD collector's edition
Disc one same as UK edition

B-sides

Personnel
Mansun
Dominic Chad – lead guitar, piano, backing vocals, synthesizer
Stove – bass
Andie Rathbone – drums
Paul Draper – vocals, guitars, piano, synthesizer, production

Technical personnel
Stefan Giradet – string arrangement
Clif Norrell – mixing
Mike Hunter – recording, engineer
Ian Caple – recording
Mark Stent – mixing, additional recording, additional production
Ronnie Stone – recording, engineer

Charts

Weekly charts

Year-end charts

Certifications

References

External links

Attack of the Grey Lantern at YouTube (streamed copy where licensed)

1997 debut albums
Mansun albums
Parlophone albums
Song cycles